The Big Short is a 2015 American historical comedy-drama film directed by Adam McKay and produced by Brad Pitt, Dede Gardner, Jeremy Kleiner, and Arnon Milchan. It was written by McKay and Charles Randolph. The film stars Christian Bale, Steve Carell, Ryan Gosling, and Pitt, with Melissa Leo, Hamish Linklater, John Magaro, Rafe Spall, Jeremy Strong, Finn Wittrock, and Marisa Tomei in supporting roles. Based on Michael Lewis's book of the same name, the film chronicles how events during the United States housing bubble led inadvertently to the financial crisis of 2007–2008.

The film made its debut on the final night of the AFI Fest on November 12, 2015. Paramount Pictures initially provided the film a limited release at eleven theaters in Los Angeles, New York, San Francisco and Chicago on December 11 before expanding to over 1,500 theaters in the United States and Canada on December 23. The film grossed $133 million on a $28 million budget. Rotten Tomatoes, a review aggregator, surveyed 325 reviews and judged 88% to be positive.

The Big Short garnered awards and nominations in a variety of categories with particular praise for McKay's direction, Bale's performance as Michael Burry, and McKay and Randolph's adapted screenplay. It garnered five nominations at the 88th Academy Awards including Best Picture and Best Director for McKay. McKay and Randolph went on to win the award for Best Adapted Screenplay.  At the 69th British Academy Film Awards, the film earned five nominations and won Best Adapted Screenplay for McKay and Randolph.

The film received four nominations at the 73rd Golden Globe Awards and two nominations at the 22nd Screen Actors Guild Awards. At the 27th Producers Guild of America Awards, The Big Short won for Best Theatrical Motion Picture. McKay was nominated for Outstanding Directing – Feature Film at the 68th Directors Guild of America Awards, and McKay and Randolph won Best Adapted Screenplay at the 68th Writers Guild of America Awards. It was nominated in seven categories at the 21st Critics' Choice Awards winning three for Best Adapted Screenplay, Best Comedy, and Best Actor in a Comedy. The film was named one of the Top 10 Films of 2015 by the American Film Institute.

Awards and nominations

See also 
 2015 in film

References

External links 
 

Lists of accolades by film